Don't Blow Your Cover: A Tribute to KMFDM is a tribute album by various industrial rock artists. It includes covers by former KMFDM members Raymond Watts (under the alias "Pig") and Guenter Schulz. The title is a play on words based on the 1988 KMFDM album Don't Blow Your Top.

The album is also sold with an identical track listing under the alternate title "Stray Bullet: A Tribute to KMFDM"

Track listing

Notes

2000 compilation albums
KMFDM tribute albums
Cleopatra Records compilation albums